Simeon ben Judah ha-Nasi also called Rabban b'Rabbi was a 3rd-century Tanna in the Land of Israel and the younger son of Judah ha-Nasi, who appointed Simeon as hakham of his yeshivah in Beit She'arim (Roman-era Jewish village).

Biography 
Judah ha-Nasi had always intended that Simeon only become the hakham of his yeshivah, while Simeon's elder brother Gamaliel was to be Judah's successor as Nasi. The Talmud states that Simeon transmitted traditions to illustrious contemporary scholars such as Ḥiyya the Great with whom he learned Psalms and Bar Kappara, with whom he learned halakic midrashim on Leviticus. Neither Hiyya or Bar Kappara recognized Simeon as their teacher and refused to honour him as such, which apparently upset Simeon. When his father was on his deathbed, he appointed Simeon as the hakham (similar to rosh yeshiva) of his yeshivah in Beit She'arim (Roman-era Jewish village), previously stating that Simeon was "the light of Israel".

Maimonides traditionally claimed 37 generations between him and Simeon, although, this has remained unproven.

Teachings
Simeon introduced several explanations in the Talmud, which he claimed to have been passed on from his father. The Talmud states that he did not approve of the fact that his father and grandfather, Simeon ben Gamaliel II cited sayings of R. Meïr without mentioning his name.

One of his more famous teachings is in regards to the later chapters of Deuteronomy 12 which states a man will be rewarded for not drinking the blood of an animal sacrifice. On this Simeon states that "If a person is rewarded for refraining from partaking of blood, which is repugnant to man, how much more so will he and his future generations be deemed meritorious for refraining from robbery and incest to which men are attracted!". In other words Simeon explains that because one rewarded for resisting an unnatural urge, one is rewarded even more so for resisting a natural urge such as robbery or unnatural fornication.

References 

Mishnah rabbis
3rd-century rabbis